James Morgan Griffin Sr. (November 1, 1918 – March 13, 1992), sometimes known as "Little Train", was an American football player and coach and educator.

Early years and education
Griffin was a native of Cape May, New Jersey.  His father was a quarterback for the Hampton Pirates football team in the early 1900s.

Griffin enrolled at Hampton Institute, played at the halfback and safety positions for the Hampton Pirates football team from 1937 to 1939, and was captain of the 1938 and 1939 teams. He graduated from Hampton in 1940 with degrees in physical education and biology. He later received a master's degree in physical education from Springfield College in 1949 and a doctorate in education from New York University in 1961.

Coaching and teaching career
In 1941, Griffin was hired as Hampton's head football coach.  He held that position during the 1941 and 1942 seasons. During World War II, he served in the United States Army where he reached the rank of first lieutenant.  He returned to Hampton as an assistant football coach in 1946 and resumed his role as head football coach in the fall of 1947. His 1947 Hampton team compiled a 7–1–1 record in the regular season and was rated No. 4 among the nation's black colleges before losing to No. 3 Florida A&M in the Orange Blossom Classic. He also coached the 1948 football team and compiled a 21–10–5 record in four seasons as head coach. He also served as Hampton's track coach from 1940 to 1970 with the exception of his period of military service from 1943 to 1945.

He remained a member of Hampton's physical education faculty until his retirement in 1984.

Later years
Griffin later served on the Hampton School Board from 1984 to 1992. He was inducted into the Central Intercollegiate Athletic Association Hall of Fame in 1980 and the City of Hampton Hall of Fame in 1992.

Griffin and his wife, Audrey, had a son, James Jr., and three daughters, Patricia, Stephanie, Blondell, and Delcenia. He died from cancer in March 1992.

Head coaching record

Football

References

External links
 

1918 births
1992 deaths
American football halfbacks
American football safeties
Hampton Pirates football coaches
Hampton Pirates football players
College track and field coaches in the United States
Hampton University faculty
New York University alumni
Springfield College (Massachusetts) alumni
United States Army personnel of World War II
United States Army officers
African-American coaches of American football
African-American players of American football
20th-century African-American sportspeople
African Americans in World War II
Deaths from cancer in the United States
African-American United States Army personnel